Darius Lashaun Rice (born October 16, 1982) is an American professional basketball player. He played college basketball for the University of Miami. He is the nephew of former professional football player, Jerry Rice.

College career
Rice played college basketball at the University of Miami.

College statistics

|-
| style="text-align:left;"| 2000-01
| style="text-align:left;"| Miami
| 29 || 29 || 30.7 || .398 || .339 || .720 || 4.9 || 1.0 || 1.0 || 0.5 || 14.1
|-
| style="text-align:left;"| 2001-02
| style="text-align:left;"| Miami
| 32 || 31 || 32.8 || .383 || .365 || .800 || 5.9 || 1.7 || 1.2 || 0.7 || 14.9
|-
| style="text-align:left;"| 2002-03
| style="text-align:left;"| Miami
| 27 || 25 || 33.4 || .426 || .364 || .763 || 5.8 || 1.2 || 1.4 || 0.8 || 18.8
|-
| style="text-align:left;"| 2003-04
| style="text-align:left;"| Miami
| 28 || 27 || 31.5 || .407 || .306 || .802 || 6.4 || 0.9 || 0.8 || 0.7 || 16.9
|- class="sortbottom"
| style="text-align:left;"| Career
| style="text-align:left;"|
| 116 || 112 || 32.1 || .403 || .344 || .776 || 5.7 || 1.2 || 1.1 || 0.6 || 16.0

Professional career
Not being drafted by any NBA team and being unknown in Europe, Rice signed for the 2004-05 season with the NBA Development League club Florida Flame. During his career, Rice played in Venezuela, Poland, China, Philippines, Puerto Rico, Uruguay, Hungary, Bahrain, Japan, Israel and Macedonia.

During his time with Dakota, he became part of NBA D-League history. On April 29, 2007, the Wizards faced the Colorado 14ers for the championship at the Bismarck Civic Center in Bismarck, North Dakota. Coming off the bench, Rice scored 52 points, with one of his eleven three-point field goals coming with 4.5 seconds in regulation to force overtime. He set a record for most points in a D-League championship game and most three-point field goals, and the Wizards won 129-121 in overtime to win the championship.

On December 28, 2014, Rice signed with the Macedonian team KK Karpoš Sokoli.

On October 29, 2016, Rice was acquired by the Austin Spurs. However, he was waived on November 11.

Career statistics

NBA D-League

Regular season

|-
| align="left" | 2004-05
| align="left" | Florida
| 42 || 38 || 29.9 || .402 || .175 || .867 || 4.2 || 2.0 || 0.7 || 0.4 || 10.5
|-
| align="left" | 2006-07
| align="left" | Dakota
| 18 || 0 || 25.5 || .445 || .381 || .800 || 4.3 || 1.4 || 0.6 || 0.3 || 13.7
|-
| align="left" | 2012–13
| align="left" | Texas
| 25 || 25 || 30.9 || .384 || .350 || .731 || 6.9 || 1.3 || 1.1 || 0.6 || 15.6
|-
| align="left" | Career
| align="left" | 
| 85 || 63 || 29.2 || .404 || .340 || .816 || 5.0 || 1.6 || 0.8 || 0.4 || 12.7

References

External links
 at draftexpress.com
 at espn.go.com
 at hurricanesports.com
 at basketball-reference.com
 at basketball.eurobasket.com
 at telegraf.mk

1982 births
Living people
American expatriate basketball people in China
American expatriate basketball people in Hungary
American expatriate basketball people in Israel
American expatriate basketball people in Japan
American expatriate basketball people in Mexico
American expatriate basketball people in North Macedonia
American expatriate basketball people in the Philippines
American expatriate basketball people in Poland
American expatriate basketball people in Qatar
American expatriate basketball people in Saudi Arabia
American expatriate basketball people in Uruguay
American expatriate basketball people in Venezuela
American men's basketball players
Atléticos de San Germán players
Basketball players from Jackson, Mississippi
Capitanes de Arecibo players
Dakota Wizards players
Florida Flame players
Jilin Northeast Tigers players
Maccabi Ashdod B.C. players
Magnolia Hotshots players
Marinos B.B.C. players
McDonald's High School All-Americans
Miami Hurricanes men's basketball players
Mineros de Zacatecas (basketball) players
Parade High School All-Americans (boys' basketball)
Philippine Basketball Association imports
Power forwards (basketball)
Sun Rockers Shibuya players
Szolnoki Olaj KK players
Texas Legends players
Sharjah SC basketball players